The Baldridge House is a historic three-story mansion in Fort Worth, Texas, U.S. It was built from 1910 to 1913 for Earl Baldridge, a cattleman and rancher who later became a banker, and his wife Florence. It was designed by Sanguinet & Staats. It was purchased by Paun Peters, the president of the Western Production Company, in 2007. It was listed for sale for $8 million in 2017.

The house has been listed as a Texas Historic Landmark by the Texas Historical Commission since 1978. Its historic marker reads

References

Houses in Fort Worth, Texas
Houses completed in 1913